The following is a list of football stadiums in Montenegro, ordered by capacity. The minimum required capacity is 1,000.

Current stadiums

Demolished stadiums
Stadiums which have been demolished and no longer exist.

See also
List of European stadiums by capacity
List of association football stadiums by capacity

References

External links
Montenegro at WorldStadiums.com

 
Montenegro
stadiums
Football stadiums